Fawdon is a Tyne and Wear Metro station, serving the Fawdon and Kenton districts of Newcastle upon Tyne. It joined the network on 10 May 1981, following the opening of the second phase of the network, between South Gosforth and Bank Foot, and is situated on the Green Line.

History
Fawdon has two platforms, which are located on opposite sides of the level crossing on Fawdon Lane. The platform to the east of the level crossing is located on the site of the former Coxlodge station, which opened in June 1905, as part of the Ponteland and Darras Hall branch of the Blyth and Tyne Railway. The line closed to passengers in June 1929, with the station closing to goods in November 1965.

In 2018, the station, along with others on the Airport branch, were refurbished as part of the Metro: All Change programme. The project saw improvements to accessibility, security and energy efficiency, as well as the re-branding of the station to the new black and white corporate colour scheme.

The station was used by 326,399 passengers in 2017–18, making it the fifth-most-used station on the Airport branch.

Facilities 
Step-free access is available at all stations across the Tyne and Wear Metro network, with ramped access to both platforms at Fawdon. The station is equipped with ticket machines, waiting shelter, seating, next train information displays, timetable posters, and an emergency help point on both platforms. Ticket machines are able to accept payment with credit and debit card (including contactless payment), notes and coins. The station is also fitted with smartcard validators, which feature at all stations across the network.

A small free car park is available, with 17 spaces, plus two accessible spaces, as well as a taxi rank. There is also the provision for cycle parking, with three cycle pods available for use.

Services 
, the station is served by up to five trains per hour on weekdays and Saturday, and up to four trains per hour during the evening and on Sunday.

Rolling stock used: Class 599 Metrocar

References

External links 

Timetable and station information for Fawdon

Newcastle upon Tyne
1981 establishments in England
Railway stations in Great Britain opened in 1981
Tyne and Wear Metro Green line stations
Transport in Newcastle upon Tyne
Transport in Tyne and Wear
